Laevicardium elatum, the Giant egg cockle, Giant Pacific cockle or the Yellow cardinal cockle, is a species of saltwater clam, a cockle, a marine bivalve mollusc in the family Cardiidae, the cockles. This species is found in the tropical Panamic Province, from Southern California south through the Pacific coast of Mexico and the Gulf of California, and as far south as Panama.

References

 Myra Keen, "Seashells of Tropical West America", second edition 1971, page 160

Cardiidae
Bivalves described in 1833